Prime Bank Cricket Club, owned by Prime Bank Limited, plays List A cricket in the Dhaka Premier Division in Bangladesh. It won the tournament in 2014–15. The club also participated in the 2013–14 Victory Day T20 Cup and was crowned the champions.

History
Prime Bank Limited established its cricket club and associated cricket academy in 2012, when it bought the ownership rights of the Old DOHS Sports Club cricket team. When the Dhaka Premier Division resumed in 2013-14 after a one-season hiatus, with List A status for the first time, Prime Bank Cricket Club was one of the 12 competing teams.

In 2014-15 Old DOHS returned to the Dhaka Premier Division as a separate team. Prime Bank won the first encounter between the two teams by 41 runs, and went on to win the championship.

List A record
 2013-14: 15 matches, won 7, finished fifth
 2014-15: 16 matches, won 13, champions
 2015-16: 16 matches, won 7, finished sixth
 2016-17: 16 matches, won 10, finished fourth
 2017-18: 11 matches, won 5, finished ninth
 2018-19: 16 matches, won 8, finished fifth
 2021-22: 15 matches, won 10, finished third
Enamul Haque Jr captained the team in 2013–14, Farhad Reza in 2014–15, Shuvagata Hom in 2015–16, and Mehedi Maruf in 2016-17 and 2017–18.

Current squad
Players with international caps are listed in bold

Records
Prime Bank's highest score is 157 not out by Ravi Bopara in 2013–14, and the best bowling figures are 6 for 21 by Rubel Hossain in 2016–17.

See also
 List of Prime Bank Cricket Club cricketers

References

External links
 List A matches played by Prime Bank Cricket Club at CricketArchive

Dhaka Premier Division Cricket League teams